Dessert bars, or simply bars or squares, are a type of American "bar cookie" that has the texture of a firm cake or softer than usual cookie. They are prepared in a pan and then baked in the oven. They are cut into squares or rectangles.  They are staples of bake sales and are often made for birthdays. They are especially popular during the holidays, but many people eat them all year. Many coffee shops and bakeries also offer the treats. Popular flavors include peanut butter bars, lemon bars, chocolate coconut bars, pineapple bars, apple bars, almond bars, toffee bars, chocolate cheesecake bars and the "famous" seven-layer bar. In addition to sugar, eggs, butter, flour and milk, common ingredients are chocolate chips, nuts, raspberry jam, coconut, cocoa powder, graham cracker, pudding, mini-marshmallows and peanut butter. More exotic bars can be made with ingredients including sour cream, rhubarb, pretzels, candies, vanilla, raisins, and pumpkin. The Nanaimo bar is a bar dessert that requires no baking and is named after the city of Nanaimo, British Columbia.

Popular belief holds that lemon squares originated in Trinidad and Tobago.

Commercial variants

In 1993 Betty Crocker added two new varieties to the four existing Supreme Dessert Bar line of baking mixes it introduced in 1992. The two new flavors, M&Ms Cookie Bars and Raspberry Bars, joined lemon bars, chocolate peanut butter bars and caramel oatmeal bars. In 2004 Krusteaz added a line of dessert bars to its selection of quick and easy baked goods. The U.S. Navy SEAL Guide to Fitness and Nutrition includes numerous bars in its "lightweight menus".

See also
 List of American desserts
 List of cookies

References

American desserts
Cuisine of the Midwestern United States
Cuisine of Minnesota
Cookies